Asphalt Massaka 2 is the second album by German rapper Farid Bang. The album was released on 12 March 2010 on the label 313 JWP.

Musical style 
Many songs contain disses towards other German rap artists, such as Fler, B-Tight, Die Sekte and Franky Kubrick. However, the album also contains storytelling tracks like "Vom Tellerwäscher zum Millionär" and "Schwer ein Mann zu sein" and even a serious track titled "Noch einmal", in which Farid Bang reflects his life and property lists, which he would gladly do again.

Track listing

Marketing 
Asphalt Massaka 2 reached chart position #56 in the German charts. Two music videos for "Es ist soweit" and "Gangsta Musik" were shot.

References

External links
 :de:Asphalt Massaka 2#Produktion

2010 albums
Farid Bang albums